Hawain is a 1997 Pakistani television series written by Asghar Nadeem Syed and directed by Haider Imran Rizvi. It was the debut serial of Komal Rizvi.

Synopsis 
The story revolves around (Ghazala) Shehnaz a teacher and her daughters (Huma) Saima and (Komal) Asma later she faces a hard time after her (Talat) husband gets arrested on a false charge of murder and his efforts and struggle to clear the charge.

Cast 
 Talat Hussain as Meer Muhammad
 Ghazala Kaifee as Shehnaz
 Huma Nawab as Saima
 Komal Rizvi as Asma
 Qazi Wajid as Doctor Aarfi
 Kaiser Khan as Raees Suleman
 Mahmood Ali as Wakeel
 Ishrat Hashmi as Masi Khyber Mail
 Mehmood Akhtar as Meer Qudratuallah
 Fareed Nawaz Baloch as Raees Eshan
 Anwar Solangi as Qadir Bilji
 Abdullah Kadwani as Aleem
 Mona Junejo as Bhajai
 Mumtaz Kanwal as Mehru
 Anil Bhatti as Suleman PA
 Aslam Latar as Deputy

References

External links
 

1990s Pakistani television series
Pakistani drama television series
Pakistan Television Corporation original programming
Pakistani family television dramas
Urdu-language television shows